The 1988 Virginia Slims of Oklahoma was a women's tennis tournament played on indoor hard courts at the Greens Country Club in Oklahoma City, Oklahoma in the United States and was part of the Category 2 tier of the 1988 Virginia Slims World Championship Series. It was the third edition of the tournament and ran from February 22 through February 28, 1988. First-seeded Lori McNeil won the singles title.

Finals

Singles

 Lori McNeil defeated  Brenda Schultz 6–3, 6–2
 It was McNeil's 2nd title of the year and the 13th of her career.

Doubles

 Jana Novotná /  Catherine Suire defeated  Catarina Lindqvist /  Tine Scheuer-Larsen 6–4, 6–4
 It was Novotná's 1st title of the year and the 4th of her career. It was Suire's 1st title of the year and the 4th of her career.

References

External links
 ITF tournament edition details
 Tournament draws

Virginia Slims of Oklahoma
U.S. National Indoor Championships
Virginia Slims of Oklahoma
Virginia Slims of Oklahoma
Virginia Slims of Oklahoma